Telluraves (also called land birds or core landbirds)  is a recently defined clade of birds defined by their arboreality. Based on most recent genetic studies, the clade unites a variety of bird groups, including the australavians (passerines, parrots, seriemas, and falcons) as well as the afroavians (including the Accipitrimorphae – eagles, hawks, buzzards, vultures etc. – owls and woodpeckers, among others). They appear to be the sister group of the Ardeae.

Given that the most basal extant members of both Afroaves (Accipitrimorphae, Strigiformes) and Australaves (Cariamiformes, Falconiformes) are carnivorous, it has been suggested that the last common ancestor of all Telluraves was probably a predator. Other researchers are skeptical of this assessment, citing the herbivorous cariamiform Strigogyps as evidence to the contrary.

Afroaves has not always been recovered as a monophyletic clade in subsequent studies. For instance, Prum et al. (2015) recovered the accipitrimorphs as the sister group to a clade (Eutelluraves) comprising the remaining Afroavian orders and Australaves., while an analysis by Houde et al. (2019) recovered a clade of accipitrimorphs and owls as sister to the remaining landbirds.

Cladogram of Telluraves relationships based on Braun & Kimball (2021)

References

Neognathae
Birds